Kuravirus is a genus of viruses within the Podoviridae family. This genus was established based on a combination of morphological features and genome organization.


Taxonomy
The following species are recognized:
 Escherichia virus 172-1
 Escherichia virus ECB2
 Escherichia virus NJ01
 Escherichia virus phiEco32
 Escherichia virus Septima11
 Escherichia virus SU10

Virology
Escherichia virus phiEco32, has a relatively rare morphology, a C3 morphotype, with an elongated head (145 x 44 nm) and a short tail (13 nm) with short kinked tail fibers.

These phages are temperate and are capable of generalized transduction with lysogenic conversion, and can have very high burst sizes.

References

Podoviridae
Virus genera